Alister Walker (born 19 September 1982) is a professional squash player who represented England. He now represents Botswana. He reached a career-high world ranking of World No. 12 in September 2009.

References

External links 
 
 
 

English male squash players
Living people
1982 births
People from Gaborone
Botswana squash players
Commonwealth Games competitors for Botswana
Squash players at the 2014 Commonwealth Games